Phoma insidiosa is a plant pathogen infecting wheat.

References

External links 
 Index Fungorum
 USDA ARS Fungal Database

Fungal plant pathogens and diseases
Wheat diseases
insidiosa
Fungi described in 1884